Karim Mohammed Allawi (born 1 April 1960) is an Iraqi football midfielder who played for Iraq in the 1986 FIFA World Cup. He also played for Al-Rasheed Club.

Career statistics

International goals
Scores and results list Iraq's goal tally first.

References

External links
FIFA profile

1960 births
Iraqi footballers
Iraq international footballers
Association football midfielders
Al-Karkh SC players
Abahani Limited (Dhaka) players
1986 FIFA World Cup players
Living people
Olympic footballers of Iraq
Footballers at the 1984 Summer Olympics
Footballers at the 1988 Summer Olympics
Asian Games medalists in football
Footballers at the 1982 Asian Games
Footballers at the 1986 Asian Games
Asian Games gold medalists for Iraq
Medalists at the 1982 Asian Games